The August Draize Farmstead is located in Union, Door County, Wisconsin. The farmstead is notable in part due to its association with the history of Belgian settlement in Wisconsin. It was added to the State and the National Register of Historic Places in 2004.

References

Belgian-American culture in Wisconsin
Farms on the National Register of Historic Places in Wisconsin
National Register of Historic Places in Door County, Wisconsin
Late 19th and Early 20th Century American Movements architecture
Brick buildings and structures